The Pathfinder & Rover Explorer Scouts' Association (P-RESA) is an independent Traditional Scouting Association in the United Kingdom, with International branches. The Association's training programme runs along the lines of Baden-Powell's original Scouting for Boys, upholding the traditions and practices set out by B-P, using the 1938 Boy Scouts' Association Policy Organisation & Rules (POR) as its basis.

Organisation

Sections

Beavers
Beavers are the youngest and newest section in Scouting, although some Groups do not operate Beaver colonies as they were not part of Baden-Powell's original concept. Beavers was one of the initial names Baden-Powell considered for the Wolf Cub section. The programme serves six to eight year olds, and is based on the Canadian Beaver Scout handbook Friends of the Forest.

Beaver Law and Oath
The Beaver Oath is:
I promise to do my best, 
to obey my Leaders and my parents
to love God and to be a good Otter. 

The Beaver Law is:
A Beaver is always busy and bright 
is a friend to all and helps other people 
by doing a good turn every day.

Motto: "Beavers" -  Always Busy and Bright

Beaver Uniform
 Cap: Grey, with pale blue piping, with Beaver's head badge in front.
 Scarf: Of the Group colour, worn with a Group ring (of one pattern, other than the 'Gilwell) or a loose knot at the throat.
 Jersey: Grey, sleeves down or rolled up at the discretion of the B.S.M.
 Shorts: Dark grey.
 Stockings: Dark blue; worn turned down below the knees, with green tabbed garter showing outside.
 Boots or shoes: Brown or black.
 Shoulder patch: Small triangular path of cloth (the colour of the Lodge), sewn at the top of left sleeve, immediately below the shoulder, with point upwards.
 Shoulder badge: Indicating the Group, worn on right shoulder or on both, according to the custom of the Group.
 County emblem: Worn on the right breast.
 District emblem: Worn on the right sleeve below the shoulder badge.

Beaver Proficiency Badges

The general scheme of Beaver proficiency badges is as follows:-

Four special proficiency badges;
Brown Paw Print Badge
Blue Paw Print Badge
Green Paw Print Badge
Red Paw Print Badge

Two additional proficiency badges;
Beaver Safety
Swimming Beaver

Wolf Cubs
In 1916, Lord Baden-Powell set up Wolf Cubs for the younger brothers of the Scouts who were desperate to join in the fun. Wolf Cubs are based around Rudyard Kipling's Jungle Book. Where a young boy brought up by a Wolf pack has to learn to develop to be a self sufficient man. Leaders take their names from the Jungle Book story.

Wolf Cub Law and Oath

The Wolf Cub Oath is:
I promise to do my best,
To do my duty to God and the King,
To keep the Law of the Wolf Pack, and do a good turn to somebody every day.

The Law of the Wolf Cub Pack is:
The Cub gives in to the Old Wolf;
The Cub does not give in to himself.

Motto: "Wolf Cubs" - Do my Best

Wolf Cub Uniform
 Cap: Green, with yellow piping, with Wolf's head badge in front.
 Scarf: Of the Group colour, worn with a Group ring (of one pattern, other than the 'Gilwell) or a loose knot at the throat. Ends to be tied with a 'Reef' Knot.
 Jersey: Green, sleeves down or rolled up at the discretion of the C.M.
 Shorts: Dark grey.
 Stockings: Dark blue; worn turned down below the knees, with green tabbed garter showing outside.
 Boots or shoes: Brown or black.
 Shoulder patch: Small triangular path of cloth (the colour of the Six), sewn at the top of left sleeve, immediately below the shoulder, with point upwards.
 Shoulder badge: Indicating the Group, worn on right shoulder or on both, according to the custom of the Group.
 County emblem: Worn on the right breast.
 District emblem: Worn on the right sleeve below the shoulder badge.

Wolf Cub Proficiency Badges

The general scheme of Cub proficiency badges is as follows:-

Two general proficiency badges;
One Star Cub
Two Star Cub

12 special proficiency badges for different subjects divided into four groups as follows:-

(1) Character (colour of badge - blue);
Collector
Observer
Gardener
(2) Handcraft (colour of badge - yellow);
Artist
Homecraft
Toymaker
(3) Service (colour of badge - red)
First Aider
Guide
House Orderly
(4) Physical Health (colour of badge - green)
Athlete
Swimmer
Team Player

One additional proficiency badge, based on the holding of certain special proficiency badges

Leaping Wolf

Pathfinder Scouts
In 1906 and 1907 Robert Baden-Powell, a lieutenant general in the British Army, wrote a book for boys about reconnaissance and scouting. Baden-Powell wrote Scouting for Boys (London, 1908), based on his earlier books about military scouting, with influence and support of Frederick Russell Burnham (Chief of Scouts in British Africa), Ernest Thompson Seton of the Woodcraft Indians, William Alexander Smith of the Boys' Brigade, and his publisher Pearson. In the summer of 1907 Baden-Powell held a camp on Brownsea Island in England to test ideas for his book. This camp and the publication of Scouting for Boys are generally regarded as the start of the Scout movement.

The movement employs the Scout method, a program of informal education with an emphasis on practical outdoor activities, including camping, woodcraft, aquatics, hiking, backpacking, and sports.

Pathfinder Scout Law and Oath
The Pathfinder Scout Law and Oath are derived from the original Scout Law and Scout Oath:

The Scout Law
 A Scouts' honour is to be trusted.
 A Scout is loyal to The King, His Country, His Scouters, His Parents, His Employers and to those under Him.
 A Scouts' duty is to be useful and help others.
 A Scout is a friend to all, and a brother to every other Scout, no matter to what Country, Class or Creed the other may belong.
 A Scout is courteous.
 A Scout is kind to animals.
 A Scout obeys the orders of his parents, Patrol Leader, or Scout Master without question.
 A Scout smiles and whistles in all difficulties.
 A Scout is thrifty
 A Scout is clean in thought, word and deed.

It is perhaps rather difficult to remember the different heads of the law. The following is easily learned and is a good way of memorising the headings:

Trusty, loyal and helpful,
Brotherly, courteous, kind,
Obedient, smiling and thrifty,
Pure as the rustling wind.

The Pathfinder Scout Oath

On my honour I promise that I will do my best
To do my duty to God and the King,
To help other people at all times,
To obey the Scout Law.

Motto:"Pathfinder Scouts" - Be Prepared.

Pathfinder Scout Uniform
The uniform worn by members of the P-RESA reflects that worn by Scouts prior to the publication of the Chief Scouts' Advance Party Report by The Scout Association in 1967.

 Hat: Khaki hat (four dents), leather band round crown, and lace worn at the back of head and tied on the brim of the hat.
 Scarf: Of the Group colour, worn with a Group ring (of one pattern, other than the 'Gilwell) or a loose knot at the throat.
 Shirt: Khaki, with two patch pockets (buttoned), and shoulder straps.
 Shorts: Dark Blue.
 Belt: Brown leather or web
 Stockings: Dark Blue, worn turned down below the knee with green tabbed garter showing on the outside.
 Boots or shoes: Brown or black.
 Shoulder knot: Llama braid six inches long, half an inch wide, of Patrol colours, on left shoulder.
 Shoulder badge: Indicating the Group, worn on right shoulder or on both, according to the custom of the Group.
 County emblem: Worn on the right breast.
 District emblem: Worn on the right sleeve below the shoulder badge.
 Staff: Every Pathfinder, including a Sea Pathfinder, should be equipped with a natural wood staff, marked in feet and inches, to be carried on all appropriate occasions.

Pathfinder Scout Proficiency Badges

The general scheme for Pathfinder proficiency badges is as follows:-

Two general proficiency badges
Second Class
First Class

44 special proficiency badges for different subjects as follows
The badges, the tests for which are marked with an asterisk must be repassed annually. Those marked with † denote public service badges:-
Airman
Ambulance*†
Artist
Athlete
Backwoodsman
Boatman
Canoeist
Camper
Civil Defence†
Climber
Coast Watchman†
Cook
Cyclist†
Electrician
Entertainer
Explorer†
Fireman†
Fisherman
Forester
Handyman†
Healthyman†
Interpreter*†
Marksman
Master-at-Arms
Missioner†
Musician (includes Bugler and Piper)
Naturalist
Oarsman
Pathfinder*
Pilot†
Pioneer
Public Health Man†
Quartermaster
Rescuer*
Rigger
Signaller*†
Stalker
Starman
Surveyor
Swimmer
Tracker
Weatherman
Wirelessman
World Friendship

Three additional proficiency badges, based on the holding of certain special proficiency badges
Scout Crown Award
All Round Cords
Bushman's Thong

Sea Pathfinder Scouts
In addition to the Pathfinder Scout Law, Oath and Motto, Sea Pathfinder Scouts have a motto, promise, special proficiency badges and additional proficiency badge of their own of their own:

Sea Pathfinder Scouts Promise
As a Sea Pathfinder Scout I promise to do my best --
 To guard against water accidents
 To know the location and proper use of the life saving equipment on every vessel I board
 To be prepared to help those in peril on the sea
 To seek to preserve the Motto of the Sea, "Women and Children First."

Sea Pathfinder Scouts Uniform
 Cap: Bluejacket's cap (with white cover from 1 May to 30 September) with ribbon inscribed "Sea Pathfinder Scouts" or, if desired, in the case of Groups operating on inland waters, the words "Pathfinder Scouts".
 Shirt or jersey: Dark blue. Jerseys with the words "Sea Pathfinder Scouts" in white letters across the chest; or shirts or jerseys with an anchor badge on the right breast. Groups wearing the words "Pathfinder Scouts" on cap ribbons will wear a blue jersey or shirt with an anchor badge in either case.
 Shorts: Dark blue.
 Belt: To be worn either underneath or outside the jersey, whichever is the practice of the Group.
 Stockings: Dark blue.
 Boots or shoes: Brown or black.

Motto: "Sea Pathfinder Scouts" - Our Best Today For a Better Tomorrow

Sea Pathfinder Scout Proficiency Badges

Three special proficiency badges

Gold Anchor
White Anchor
Red Anchor

One additional proficiency badge, based on the holding of certain special proficiency badges

Sea Scout Crown Award (Seaman's badge)

Air Pathfinder Scouts
There is no Aviation branch within The Pathfinder & Rover Explorer Scouts’ Association.

In the July 1932 edition of the Scouter, Lord Robert Baden-Powell wrote:
"...it has been suggested that Air Scouts should be organised in the same way as Sea Scouts."
"Though the air is 'ever with us', access to aerodromes is not common and though Sea Scouts can mess about 'in any old boat', a Scout is unlikely to be able to get access to an aeroplane, and even if he did he would not be able to fly it. ...it seems hardly feasible to have special 'Air Scouts', yet a great deal may be accomplished by troops specialising in air-work... I shall always be pleased to give what advice I can."

Rover Explorer Scouts
Rover Scouts, Rovers, Rover Scouting or Rovering is a service program associated with Scouting for men and women, with no upper age limit. A group of Rovers is called a 'Rover Crew'.

The Rover program was originated by The Boy Scouts' Association in the United Kingdom in 1918 to provide a program for young men who had grown up beyond the age range of the Boy Scouts.

Rover Explorer Scouts' Law and Oath

Rover Explorer Scouts use the same Law and Oath as Pathfinder Scouts.

Motto: "Rover Explorer Scouts " - Service.

Rover Explorer Scouts Uniform

A Rover Explorer Scout wears uniform as for a Pathfinder Scout, but with the following differences:-
 Shoulder knot: Red, yellow and green.
 Garter tabs: Red.
 Thumbstick: In place of staff.
 Shoulder straps: Green, with Pathfinder badge, with the word "Rovers" below.

Rover Explorer Sea Scouts Uniform

A Rover Explorer Sea Scout wears uniform as for a Sea Pathfinder Scout, but with the following difference:-
 Cap: With ribbon inscribed "Rover Sea Explorer Scouts" or, if desired, in the case of Groups operating on inland waters, the words "Rover Explorer Scouts."
 Shoulder knot: Red, yellow and green.
 Garter tabs: Red.
 Thumbstick: In place of staff.
 Shoulder straps: Green, with Pathfinder badge, with the word "Rovers" below.

Rover Explorer Scouts Proficiency Badges

Why do Rovers have badges? The P-RESA Rover Scout training programme was designed to run in conjunction with the Traditional Woodbadge (Leader) Training Scheme and Charge Certificate Scheme (Activity Permits).
Just like young people, adults like to earn awards to display their achievements too! The scheme enables individuals who have never been in Scouting/Guiding the opportunity to learn and experience Scouting first hand, as well as preparing individuals for leadership roles.

The general scheme for Rover Explorer Scouts proficiency badges is as follows (badges followed by * denote public service badges):-

Five general proficiency badges
Progress Badge
Rambler's Badge
Rover Instructor Badge
Scoutcraft Star
Service Training Star

13 special proficiency badges for different subjects as follows;
Community Resilience
Master Backwoodsman
Master Camp Crewman
Master Canoeist
Master Cartographer
Master Cook
Master Explorer*
Master First Aider*
Master Pioneer
Master Quartermaster
Master Rescuer*
Master Signaller*
Master Swimmer

Four additional proficiency badges, based on the holding of certain special proficiency badges
A1 Rover Scout Cord
B-P Award
Roland Philipps Challenge Award
Rover Scout Crown Award

Outlanders Oath
Overseas members residing in the UK or non-Christians may take the Outlanders Oath: 

On my honour I promise that I will do my best
To do my duty to the Country in which I live,
To help other people at all times.
To obey the Scout Law. 

Members who have taken the Outlanders Oath, wear the Outlanders Badge.

History

1982 - 2003
The 'Explorer Scouts' and 'Pathfinder Scouts Association' had been a combined independent Scout organisation from 1982 and registered as a youth organisation in Fulham, London. under the educational Charity Status of 'Walham Green Youth Council'. In the 1980s the members of The 'Explorer Scouts' and 'Pathfinder Scouts Association' joined the Baden Powell Scouts Association. In early 1992, some of the PSA leaders who had been members of Baden-Powell Scouts' Association (B-PSA) joined the British Boy Scouts (BBS). After failing to gain agreement on many issues to do with traditional scouting, these members left the BBS group and set up 'The British Pathfinder Scouts Association (BPSA), which incorporated an adult section dealing with the training and building up of good leadership through the 'Rover Explorer Scout Association'. The new Association was registered as a Charity at Law in September 1993, leaving behind the older name 'Explorer Scouts'.

In 1995 the founding and Chief Commissioners of the BPSA were Ray O'Donnell-Hampton and Steven Dudley-Coventry. After much disagreement about the quality of Scouting tradition, Ray O'Donnell-Hampton handed in his warrant and left the BPSA.  The number of groups fell after the death of Dudley-Coventry and the BPSA's 'Scoutmasters Court of Honour' dissolved its charitable status without consultation with commissioners past or present. The BPSA was then officially wound up in April 1998, with the remaining badges being passed on, again without any consultation, to the British Boy Scouts.

In 1999 Ray O'Donnell-Hampton and some of the older members of the previous association met and re-established the Pathfinder Scouts Association which was registered as a Charity in October 2003 under the umbrella of the 'Rover Explorer Scouts Association' (RESA).

The Association quickly began to regain membership and had connections with new members and groups including many lone Scouts' from around the world. There are membership, affiliations and branches in USA, Canada, South America, Australia, West Indies, Philippines, RESA Delta - Malaysia, China, Singapore, Thailand, Hong Kong, Vietnam, Sri Lanka & Indonesia, Holland, Germany, the United Kingdom and Ireland.

2003 - Present
The Pathfinder Scouts' Association (PSA) and The Rover Explorer Scouts' Association (RESA), had for a while divided into separate associations, so that each was able to build its own area of expertise.

In October 2003 the Bedfordshire Pathfinder Scouts (affiliated members) of the Pathfinder Scouts' Association were registered with the Charity Commission, having the stated aims "to promote the physical, intellectual, social and spiritual well being of children and young people aged between 5 - 18 years in Bedfordshire and other areas through the provision of Pathfinder Traditional Scouting activities. These include adventure based on Baden Powell's Scouting for Boys, sport and other recreational activities." The Bedfordshire Pathfinder Scouts were affiliated to the Rover Explorer Scouts' Association, until they folded in 2007

On 29 July 2011, Ray O'Donnell-Hampton retired as Chief Commissioner, investing Adrian McDowell as the New Chief Commissioner of P-RESA, seeing both associations merging together and becoming more active around the world.

The ceremony took place at the Associations' International Headquarters (IHQ) 'The Den', East Anglia, England. Adrian was awarded the 3-bead Wood Badge and Ray was bestowed with the title of Chief Commissioner Emeritus.

In June 2018 at 'Brownsea Island' The Baden Powell Pathfinder Movement {BPPM} IHQ Scoutmasters Court of Honour awarded Ray O'Donnell-Hampton the Bronze Wolf and invested him with the title of 'Deputy Chief Scout'.

International Branches
The Baden Powell Pathfinder Movement {BPPM} has Members in 15 countries.
The IHQ UK {Scoutmaster Court of Honour}
Covers 5 Regions Worldwide:-

Africa
Gambia - Nigeria

Asia
China - Hong Kong - Malaysia - Nepal - Philippines - Thailand - Vietnam

Europe
Switzerland

Oceania
Australia - New Zealand

The Americas
Argentina - Canada - United States of America

References

Non-aligned Scouting organizations
Organizations established in 1982
1982 establishments in the United Kingdom